Vladimir Iosifovich Kaplunov (2 March 1933 – 2015) was a Russian weightlifter. He won a world title in 1962 and a silver medal at the 1964 Olympics.

In 1961 Kaplunov finished second at the Soviet lightweight championships and was included to the national team. Next years he won the Soviet title, and repeated this achievement in 1963 and 1964. He also won European titles in 1962 and 1964 and a world title in 1962. In 1966 Kaplunov switched to the middleweight category, but finished only third at the national championships. During his career Kaplunov set ten lightweight world records, five in the press, two in the clean and jerk, and three in the total, as well as two middleweight records, both in press. After retiring from competitions Kaplunov worked as a weightlifting coach in Odintsovo, Moscow Oblast.

References

External links

1933 births
2015 deaths
Russian male weightlifters
Soviet male weightlifters
Olympic weightlifters of the Soviet Union
Weightlifters at the 1964 Summer Olympics
Olympic silver medalists for the Soviet Union
Olympic medalists in weightlifting
Medalists at the 1964 Summer Olympics
European Weightlifting Championships medalists
World Weightlifting Championships medalists
Sportspeople from Krasnoyarsk Krai